Toçi is an Albanian surname that may refer to
Fatmir Toçi (born 1958), Albanian publisher
Irakli Toçi (born 1981), Albanian football player 
Mateos Toçi (born 1993), Albanian football player
Terenc Toçi (1880–1945), Albanian politician

Albanian-language surnames